Llantysilio is a community in Denbighshire, Wales, near Llangollen.  It has a population of 472, falling to 421 at the 2011 census.

The community includes the site of Valle Crucis Abbey, the Horseshoe Pass, and Llantysilio Hall; it also includes the villages of Pentredwr and Rhewl, as well as the areas of Eglwyseg, Llandynan, and Llidiart Annie.

References

External links

 http://www.llantysiliocc.co.uk – Llantysilio Community Council website

Communities in Denbighshire